Nils Olsson (March 10, 1891 – September 21, 1951) was a Swedish architect.

Biography
Nils Olsson was born at Halmstad in Halland, Sweden. He studied at the Technical Elementary School in Malmö and then at Technical University of Munich  1908–1913. He worked in Gothenburg from the 1920s until his death in 1951. He won a bronze medal in the art competitions of the 1948 Summer Olympics for designing the  Valhalla Swimming Hall (Valhallabadet)   at Gothenburg.

References

External links
  Olympics.com database 

1891 births
1951 deaths
 people from Halland
Technical University of Munich alumni
Swedish architects
Modernist architecture in Scandinavia
Medalists at the 1948 Summer Olympics
Olympic bronze medalists in art competitions
Olympic competitors in art competitions